Since the 1940s, the comic book character Captain America has been presented in a wide variety of other media, including serial films, feature films, animations, and video games.

Film

Animation

Captain America has been featured in both Ultimate Avengers and Ultimate Avengers 2, an animated direct-to-video series that is an adaptation of the Ultimates produced by Marvel Entertainment and Lions Gate Films, voiced by Justin Gross. The character is based on the Ultimate Captain America and serves as the main protagonist in both films.
In the 2008 direct-to-video film Next Avengers: Heroes of Tomorrow, Captain America and the Black Widow's son, James Rogers, voiced by Noah C. Crawford, is the main protagonist. James is a skilled martial artist like his parents and, by the end of the film, is the de facto leader of the group. He wields a wrist device that projects energy constructs of his father's shield, but it is destroyed by the Iron Black Widow. James then uses the original shield in the final battle with Ultron. Captain America however was killed by Ultron prior to the events of the film along with the other Avengers (though Vision, Iron Man, and the Hulk are in hiding and Thor is ruler of Asgard).
Captain America appears in the team-up film Iron Man & Captain America: Heroes United, reprised by Roger Craig Smith.
Captain America makes an appearance in Marvel Rising: Secret Warriors, with Roger Craig Smith reprising his role.
Captain America appears in Lego Marvel Super Heroes - Black Panther: Trouble in Wakanda, with Roger Craig Smith reprising his role.

Television

1960s

The Marvel Super Heroes (1966): Captain America was one of the five featured superheroes, starring in one "Captain America" segment a week. They were largely straightforward adaptations of not just the character's solo stories from Tales of Suspense, but also several stories from The Avengers series as well.

1970s
 Captain America appeared in two 1979 live-action television movies that aired on CBS: Captain America, which aired January 19, 1979, and Captain America II: Death Too Soon, which was broadcast on November 23, 1979, both starring Reb Brown in the title role. The character differs significantly from the comics in both his origin and his operations. For instance, Steve Rogers is a character in contemporary times whose father was the original Captain America, a 1940s government agent. The very patriotic attitude of Steve's father earned him the nickname Captain America, and his father is spoken of as having been murdered. Rogers, a former Marine now making a modest living as an artist, was inspired by this story to sketch a super-hero. After receiving potentially fatal injuries in an accident, he was administered an experimental chemical called the FLAG—Full Latent Ability Gain—formula (at one point referred to as a "super-steroid") which not only saves his life but also enhances his body with heightened strength and reflexes. These new abilities lead Dr. Simon Mills (Len Birman), the research biochemist and intelligence official who had told Rogers about his father, to recruit him and give Steve a costume based on his drawing. As Captain America, he also makes significant use of a specialized reconstruction of the van he has been driving, out the rear of which can be launched a modified motorcycle. Its functions include a rocket thrust for a fast start out of the van, a jet boost for increased speed, a setting to allow the bike to be ridden with less noise for stealthier movement and a hang glider structure which can allow the bike to glide to the ground with some forward momentum, although it must be jettisoned upon landing. The bike has a round windshield, described as being made of "Jet-Age plastics," with concentric circles that alternate between red and transparent around a centered star, blue in color. He is able to detach this, and he uses it as his shield when he goes on foot. At the end of the first movie, Rogers briefly appears in his father's costume—more accurately a uniform—that bears a stronger resemblance to the uniform Captain America is seen wearing in the comics, and he wears this uniform in the sequel.
 In Captain America II: Death Too Soon, Brown's Steve Rogers is first shown sketching a portrait of a Mrs. Shawn (Susan French), who complains to him about a gang of muggers who have been stealing the proceeds from cashed Social Security checks; she denies having cashed her most recent one. He bids her to do this in order to set a trap for the muggers, and then he springs it as Captain America. In the meantime, a free-lance revolutionary terrorist calling himself General Miguel (Christopher Lee), planning to fight an unspecified war, kidnaps a Professor Ian Ilson (Christopher Cary) and forces him to resume his research in manipulative gerontology. Ilson has managed to formulate both a chemical that accelerates aging and the antidote to the same chemical, and Miguel, posing as the warden of a prison in Oregon near Portland, plans to use the chemicals in question to hold Portland hostage for a multimillion-dollar ransom. Ultimately Brown's Captain America and Lee's General Miguel directly clash face-to-face, and when Miguel throws a glass bottle of the aging accelerant into the air, hoping it will shatter against Captain America's body, the Captain throws his shield into the air, where it shatters the bottle in such a manner that the aging accelerant splashes Miguel instead, aging him literally to death in less than a minute. The telefilm was directed by Ivan Nagy.

Both of these films were released on DVD for the first time together in 2011 from Shout! Factory.

1980s
 Captain America appears in the Spider-Man episode "The Capture of Captain America", voiced by George DiCenzo.
 Captain America appears in the Spider-Man and His Amazing Friends episodes "7 Little Superheroes" and "Pawns of the Kingpin", again voiced by George DiCenzo.
 Captain America also appeared in a 1980 public service announcement on energy conservation, in which he battled the Thermal Thief, the Wattage Waster, and the Cold Air Crook.

1990s
 Captain America appeared in the X-Men episode "Old Soldiers", voiced by Lawrence Bayne. He is an American agent, sent along with Canadian agent Wolverine, to rescue a scientist kidnapped by the Red Skull and the Nazis. He is present in the episode only in flashbacks of Wolverine's. Captain America is voiced by Lawrence Bayne. Additionally, Captain America appears in a brief cameo in the episode "Red Dawn", before the awakening of his Russian counterpart Omega Red.
 An alternate version of Captain America appeared in the episode "One Man's Worth". In a timeline in which Charles Xavier was murdered before founding the X-Men, Captain America is the leader of a taskforce of superhuman mutant hunters fighting a war against the Mutant Resistance led by Magneto.
 Captain America made a few appearances in Spider-Man, voiced by David Hayter:
 He first appeared in "The Cat", with a cameo when Peter Parker is narrating a flashback scene with John Hardeski witnessing the experiment that made Steve Rogers into Captain America. The Red Skull makes a cameo as well.
 He appeared in the last three episodes of the "Six Forgotten Warriors" saga. The third provides a flashback scene explaining Captain America's disappearance after World War II: he and the Red Skull were trapped in a dimensional machine for the last 50 years. In the last two episodes Captain America is released from the machine (with the Red Skull), and in the final installment he and the Red Skull fight and are, in the end, trapped in the machine once again.
 In the "Secret Wars" three-parter, Captain America was one of the heroes Spider-Man selected to lead against the villains, choosing him due to his past experience with the Red Skull.
 Captain America was one of several Avengers who made cameo appearances in the second season of the mid-1990s Fantastic Four series.
 Captain America appears in The Avengers: United They Stand episode "Command Decision". The story involves the Masters of Evil and a flashback to Captain America defeating Baron Zemo. He was voiced by Dan Chameroy.
 In the 1990s, a planned Captain America animated series from Saban Entertainment to air on Fox Kids proposed that Captain America's true name was Tommy Tompkins, with "Steve Rogers" being a cover name assigned to him by the U.S. Army. The Red Skull would appear as the main antagonist. The series was cancelled in preproduction with scripts written, characters designed and a one-minute pitch film produced, because of Marvel's bankruptcy.

2000s
 X-Men: Evolution (2000): Captain America and Nick Fury appear in one episode, "Operation Rebirth". In this episode, Captain America is made into the super soldier during World War II through the use of a stasis tank chamber called "Operation Rebirth", similar to the comics. He gains incredible physical prowess much like his comic book counterpart, but at a hefty price; a defect in the process causes eventual cellular breakdown, forcing Captain America to be put into stasis until a cure can be found. During World War II, he participates in a joint operation with the Canadian soldier Logan to liberate a POW camp, where he saves a boy named Erik Lehnsherr, the future Magneto. When he begins to break down, he and Logan destroy Project Rebirth's stasis tank so that no one else will have to suffer through his condition. Logan later learns that another one was made and subsequently stolen by Magneto, as it has a fountain of youth-like effect on mutants. The episode ends with Wolverine visiting Captain America's stasis chamber, telling his old comrade that they will find a cure for his condition eventually, and also assuring him that they made a great team in their time.
 Captain America appears in The Super Hero Squad Show voiced by Tom Kenny. In this show he is seen as a leader who will often go rambling about the 1930s and 1940s, and occasionally even forgets he is no longer in the 1940s.
In Iron Man: Armored Adventures, Captain America is frequently referenced. In "Ghosts in the Machine", a class is seen being taught about Captain America who participated in three public battles in World War 2. A picture of Captain America is seen as well. In "Extremist", S.H.I.E.L.D. was mentioned to have recovered Captain America.

2010s
 Captain America appeared in the first episode of Black Panther, voiced by Adrian Pasdar. He traveled to Wakanda during World War II in search of Nazi invaders, facing T'Challa's father, T'Chaka.
 Captain America is featured in The Avengers: Earth's Mightiest Heroes, voiced by Brian Bloom. His frozen body is initially found and thawed out by the Avengers in the episode "Living Legend", and he joins the team at the end of the episode. At the end of the first-season finale, "A Day Unlike Any Other", Captain America is captured and replaced by a Skrull. In season two of episode "Prisoner of War", Captain America was held captive in the Skrull ship for two months, after which Captain America freed and helps others captive to escape from the Skrull ship. In the episode "Secret Invasion", Captain America returns to Earth and assists the Avengers in battling the Skrulls. In "Code Red", Iron Man officially makes Captain America the leader.
 Captain America appears in Lego Marvel Super Heroes: Maximum Overload, voiced by Roger Craig Smith.
 Captain America appears in the Toei anime series Marvel Disk Wars: The Avengers, voiced by Kazuhiro Nakaya in Japanese dubbed version. In the English dubbed version, he is reprised by Roger Craig Smith.
 Captain America appears in the television special Lego Marvel Super Heroes: Avengers Reassembled, voiced again by Roger Craig Smith.
 Captain America is mentioned in the 2011 episode, "Ghost in the Machine" of Iron Man: Armored Adventures on a history test Tony Stark takes.
 Captain America appears in Marvel Future Avengers, with Kazuhiro Nakaya and Roger Craig Smith reprising their roles in the Japanese and English dubbed versions from Marvel Disk Wars: The Avengers and various Marvel media respectively.

Marvel Animation 
 Captain America appears in Ultimate Spider-Man, voiced by Roger Craig Smith. In the episode "Not a Toy", he joins forces with Spider-Man to retrieve his shield from Doctor Doom to stop him from analyzing and replicating the unique vibranium-adamantium alloy properties of in the shield. He has a brief cameo in the episode "Guardians of the Galaxy", where he is voiced by Chris Cox.
 Captain America appears in Avengers Assemble, voiced once again by Roger Craig Smith. Matthew Mercer was originally supposed to take over the role in Season 3, but instead Smith maintained it. In the first episode, Captain America is apparently destroyed by his enemy Red Skull, but it is then revealed that Red Skull captured him so he could body switch with Captain America, since he was dying and needed to switch bodies with him because of the super-soldier serum in him worked. Captain America then rejoins the team after Red Skull's defeat.
 Captain America appears the Hulk and the Agents of S.M.A.S.H., voiced again by Roger Craig Smith. He has made a brief cameo appearance in the episode "Monsters No More". He later reappears in "Guardians of the Galaxy" along with the Avengers being Skrulls in disguise. In "Days of Future Smash: Year of the Hydra", He appeared in the past fighting alongside a time-traveling Hulk during World War II to stop The Leader and Red Skull from recreating Dr. Erskine's super soldier serum and augmenting it with gamma radiation. Simultaneously in an alternate future timeline, Captain America fights to save the world as it was taken over by Hydra and run by The Leader. In this timeline, Captain America was never frozen but despite being in his late nineties, the super soldier serum in his body appeared to retard his aging, still in peak physical condition and appearing only in his mid/late forties. Ultimately, Hulk and past-Captain America stop The Leader, returning the timeline to its original settings.
 Captain America appears in the Guardians of the Galaxy episodes "Stayin' Alive" and "Evolution Rock", voiced again by Roger Craig Smith.
 Captain America appears in the Spider-Man episode “School of Hard Knocks”, again voiced by Roger Craig Smith.

Marvel Cinematic Universe 
 The Marvel Cinematic Universe version of Captain America briefly appears via stock footage in the pilot episode of Agents of S.H.I.E.L.D. In November 2013, Jed Whedon, the co-creator of the television series Agents of S.H.I.E.L.D., said that there were plans to reference events from Captain America: The Winter Soldier in the show. In March 2014, a promotional logo for Agents of S.H.I.E.L.D. surfaced which features an image of Captain America's shield, teasing the series of episodes dubbed "Uprising".
 In April 2016, ahead of the release of the Captain America: Civil War film and after the final season of Agent Carter, ABC aired an official Marvel documentary entitled Captain America: 75 Heroic Years, exploring Captain America's history and featuring Chris Evans, Stan Lee, Steve Engelhardt and more.
 Captain America was referenced several times in Jessica Jones for his involvement in the Battle of New York. In Episode 5 "AKA The Sandwich Saved Me," a child can be seen running around in a Captain America costume.
 In The Falcon and the Winter Soldier, Sam Wilson gives up the shield after the events of Avengers: Endgame and the US government hands the shield and the mantle of Captain America to John Walker. After he kills a member of the Flag Smashers in view of the public, Wilson and Bucky Barnes take the shield from Walker and he is stripped of the Captain America title by the government. Wilson then decides to take the mantle of Captain America after witnessing the injustice visited upon Black Super Soldier Isaiah Bradley by the government. The series ends with the title card Captain America and the Winter Soldier.
Alternate versions of Captain America/Steve Rogers from the multiverse appear in the animated series What If...?. He is voiced by Josh Keaton, replacing Chris Evans for the show.

Video games
 Captain America is the main protagonist in Captain America in: The Doom Tube of Dr. Megalomann.
 He appeared in Spider-Man and Captain America in Doctor Doom's Revenge.
 He is one of four playable characters in Captain America and the Avengers.
 He later appeared in Capcom's Marvel Super Heroes and the subsequent Marvel vs. Capcom series, voiced by Cathal J. Dodd until Marvel vs. Capcom 3: Fate of Two Worlds and Ultimate Marvel vs. Capcom 3, where he is now voiced by Brian Bloom, reprising his role from The Avengers: Earth's Mightiest Heroes series.
 He appeared in Spider-Man and Venom: Maximum Carnage.
 He appeared in Avengers in Galactic Storm.
 He appeared in Venom/Spider-Man: Separation Anxiety.
 He is a playable character in Marvel Super Heroes In War of the Gems.
 He appeared in the Spider-Man video game, Venom and Black Cat call him in to rescue Spider-Man after he escapes from Doctor Octopus' undersea base.
 In Spider-Man 2: Enter Electro (2001), an article in the Daily Bugle newspaper reporting the events of the last game gave Captain America credit to stopping "Doctor Octopus and Spider-Man's plot."
 Captain America had a cameo in The Amazing Spider-Man 2 for Game Boy.
 He had a cameo in the home-console versions of Electronic Arts' Marvel Nemesis: Rise of the Imperfects, in which he is captured by aliens; he appeared as a playable character in only the PSP version of this game.
 He appeared as a playable character in Marvel: Ultimate Alliance, voiced by Trev Broudy. He is seen mostly in the cut scenes with Spider-Man, Thor, and Wolverine. His costumes include his classic, Ultimate, WWII, and U.S. Agent outfits. A simulation disk has Captain America preventing Winter Soldier from launching missiles from the S.H.I.E.L.D. Helicarrier. In the cut-scenes, he wears his Ultimate counterpart's costume.
 He is a playable character in Marvel: Ultimate Alliance 2, voiced by David Kaye. As in the storyline the game is based on, Cap leads the Anti-Registration forces against the Superhuman Registration Act, locked in the anti-registration team along with Luke Cage and Iron Fist.
 He is a playable character in Marvel Super Hero Squad and its sequel, voiced by Tom Kenny.
 A Captain America costume is available as downloadable content for LittleBigPlanet, as part of "Marvel Costume Kit 3".
 He is the protagonist of the game Captain America: Super Soldier, which is the movie tie-in for the film Captain America: The First Avenger, and features the voice of Chris Evans, reprising his role from the film.
 Captain America is a playable character in the beat em up game Marvel Super Hero Squad.
 Captain America is a playable character in Marvel Super Hero Squad Online.
 Captain America is a playable character in Marvel Super Hero Squad: The Infinity Gauntlet.
 Captain America is a playable character in Marvel Super Hero Squad: Comic Combat voiced by Tom Kenny.
 Captain America is briefly mentioned by Spider-Man in Spider-Man: Edge of Time.
 Captain America is a playable character in the Facebook game Marvel: Avengers Alliance.
 Captain America is mentioned in The Amazing Spider-Man video game (based on the film The Amazing Spider-Man). Sometimes if Spider-Man picks up an escaped mental hospital inmate they will say "Thanks for picking me up Captain America!" to which Spider-Man says "Wrong person."
 Captain America is the playable character in the game Captain America: Sentinel of Liberty on the iOS platform, in which the player attempts to rescue several of the Captain's comrades from their Nazi captors behind enemy lines, and defeat Cap's nemesis the Red Skull. The controls are gesture-based, and the game is a platformer with up-and-down as well as side-to-side motion. The game offers both combat and "widget-hunt" elements, as well as achievements and unlockable costumes for Cap to wear and unlockable Captain America comic book cover art to view.
 Captain America appears as a playable character in the fighting game Marvel Avengers: Battle for Earth.
 Captain America is a playable character in the Avengers Initiative mobile app game for Android and iOS.
 Captain America is a playable character in the MMORPG Marvel Heroes, voiced by Brian Bloom.
 Captain America is a playable character in Lego Marvel Super Heroes voiced by Roger Craig Smith. He serves as one of the main story characters.
 Captain America is a playable character in Marvel Avengers Alliance Tactics.
 Captain America is a playable character in Marvel: Contest of Champions. His WWII outfit also appears as a separate character. An original form of Steve Rogers, named Civil Warrior, also appears.
 Captain America is a playable character in Disney Infinity: Marvel Super Heroes, voiced again by Roger Craig Smith.
 Captain America is a playable character in Marvel Mighty Heroes.
 Captain America is a playable character in Disney Infinity 3.0, with Roger Craig Smith reprising his role.
 Captain America is a playable character in Lego Marvel's Avengers, based on his appearance in the Marvel Cinematic Universe, with reused lines originally done by Chris Evans.
 Captain America is a playable character in Marvel: Future Fight.
 Captain America is a playable character in Marvel Strike Force.
 Captain America appears as a student in Marvel Avengers Academy, voiced by Dean Panaro.
 Captain America is a playable character in Marvel vs. Capcom: Infinite, voiced again by Brian Bloom.
 There are four playable versions of Captain America ("Steve Rogers", "Super Soldier", "First Avenger" and "Infinity War") in the match-three mobile game Marvel Puzzle Quest.
 Captain America is a playable character in Lego Marvel Super Heroes 2, voiced by Josh Cowdery. He serves as one of the main story characters. In addition to Captain America, his variants that also appear include his pilot attire, his Secret Empire counterpart, his Wild West counterpart, Capwolf, and Captain Avalon.
 Captain America is parodied as "Captain Steroid" in Hollywhoot: Idle Hollywood Parody.
 Captain America is a playable character in Marvel Powers United VR, voiced again by Roger Craig Smith.
 Captain America appears in Marvel Dimension of Heroes, voiced again by Brian Bloom.
 Captain America appears as a purchasable outfit in Fortnite Battle Royale.
 Captain America appears in Avengers, voiced by Jeff Schine.
 Captain America is a playable character in Marvel Future Revolution, voiced again by Brian Bloom. Many other versions of Steve Rogers from alternate realities also appear as NPCs, such as one who led a gladiator rebellion on Sakaar or one who became a thrall of Doctor Strange's arch enemy Dormammu.
 Captain America will be a playable character in a currently untitled video game developed by Skydance New Media.

Motion comics
 Captain America appears in the Spider-Woman: Agent of S.W.O.R.D. motion comic, voiced by Jeffrey Hedquist.
 Captain America appears in the Ultimate Hulk vs. Wolverine motion comic, voiced by Trevor Devall.
 Captain America appears in the Wolverine versus Sabretooth motion comic, voiced again by Trevor Devall.
 Captain America appears in the Wolverine: Weapon X motion comic, voiced by Clay St. Thomas.

Novels
Captain America was the subject of Marvel's second foray into prose book licensing: The Great Gold Steal by Ted White in 1968, following an Avengers novel in 1967. This novel presented a different version of Captain America. The novel adds a further element to the Super-Soldier process wherein Rogers' bones are plated with stainless steel. The character later appears in Captain America: Holocaust For Hire by Joseph Silva published by Pocket Books in 1979 and Captain America: Liberty's Torch by Tony Isabella and Bob Ingersoll published in 1998, in which the hero is put on trial for the imagined crimes of America by a hostile militia group.

Live performances
 In 1985, a musical about Captain America was announced for Broadway. The piece, written by Mel Mandel and Norman Sachs, never actually premiered, although recordings of the score have surfaced.
 Captain America was one of the superheroes portrayed in the 1987 live adaptation of Spider-Man and Mary Jane Watson's wedding performed at Shea Stadium.
 Captain America appears in the stage show Marvel Universe Live!.

Fine arts

In July 2016, Marvel and Disney announced that they would be unveiling a 13-foot-tall, one ton bronze statue of Captain America at the 2016 San Diego Comic-Con. The statue, designed by artists at Marvel and Comicave Studios, would tour the United States before its destination in Brooklyn, the character's hometown in the Marvel Cinematic Universe. The statue had a dedication ceremony at Brooklyn's Prospect Park on August 10, 2016, stayed there for two weeks before going to Barclays Center for a month, and has since been on display at a Bed Bath & Beyond complex at Industry City - it does not yet have a permanent home.

Starting with the Pop Art period and on a continuing basis, since the 1960s the character of Captain America has been "appropriated" by multiple visual artists and incorporated into contemporary artwork, most notably by Andy Warhol, Roy Lichtenstein, Mel Ramos, Dulce Pinzon, Mr. Brainwash, and others.

Intellectual property rights
Marvel Comics has held several trademark registrations for the name "Captain America" as well as the distinctive logos used on the comic book series and in the associated merchandising. An application was filed on August 10, 1967, for use in comic books and magazines and a registration was granted by the United States Patent and Trademark Office on August 13, 1968. Marvel's parent company, Disney, received a design patent on Captain America's shield in 2018.

Infringement case
The Scottish Indie rock band Eugenius was formerly known as Captain America and released the Wow (1991) and Flame On (1992) eps under that name. The threat of legal action by Marvel Comics made the band change its name.

References

External links